George LeGrande Watkins (June 8, 1886 – March 14, 1962) was an American college football player and coach and the mayor of Tulsa, Oklahoma from 1930 to 1932. In 1959, Watkins was made chairman of the Tulsa County Excise Board by the Oklahoma Tax Commission.

Sewanee
Watkins was a prominent center for the Sewanee Tigers football teams of Sewanee: The University of the South, a small Episcopal school in the mountains of Tennessee. He thrice made All-Southern. Watkins was unanimously selected captain of the 1906 team. He is the second-team center on Sewanee's all-time team, behind Frank Juhan. At Sewanee he was a member of the Phi Delta Theta fraternity.

Louisiana Tech
Watkins was an athletic coach instructor in math and history at Louisiana Industrial Institute—now known as Louisiana Tech University during the 1907–08 year. As football coach, he led the 1907 Louisiana Industrial football team to a record of 9–1. He was also the school's baseball coach in the spring of 1908.

Head coaching record

Football

References

External links
 

1886 births
1962 deaths
American football centers
All-Southern college football players
Louisiana Tech Bulldogs baseball coaches
Louisiana Tech Bulldogs football coaches
Mayors of Tulsa, Oklahoma
Oklahoma Democrats
Sewanee Tigers football coaches
Sewanee Tigers football players
People from Marengo County, Alabama
Sportspeople from Tulsa, Oklahoma
Coaches of American football from Alabama
Players of American football from Alabama